Trenel is a town located in the north west of La Pampa Province in Argentina.

References

External links

Populated places in La Pampa Province